Shuko Aoyama and Yang Zhaoxuan are the defending champions, however Yang chose to participate in Eastbourne. Aoyama played alongside Monica Niculescu but lost in the semifinals to Alicja Rosolska and Abigail Spears.

Kirsten Flipkens and Johanna Larsson won the title after defeating Rosolska and Spears 6–4, 3–6, [11–9] in the final.

Seeds

Draw

Draw

References
Main Draw

Fuzion 100 Southsea Trophy - Doubles
Southsea Trophy